Bloxham School, also called All Saints' School, is a private co-educational day and boarding school of the British public school tradition, located in the village of Bloxham, three miles (5 km) from the town of Banbury in Oxfordshire, England. The present school was founded in 1860 by Philip Reginald Egerton and has since become a member of the Woodard Corporation. The current headmaster is Paul Sanderson, who took over from Mark Allbrook in 2013. The school has approximately 515 pupils.

Founded as a school of the Oxford Movement, Bloxham is a member of the Headmasters' and Headmistresses' Conference.

History

Hewett's school
The original school on the site in the north of the village of Bloxham was founded in 1853 by John William Hewett (1824-1886), a local Anglo-Catholic curate. The school was supported by Samuel Wilberforce who commissioned the diocesan architect, George Edmund Street, to draw up plans for the new school buildings. Street's design was described by The Gentleman's Magazine as the 'most beautiful modern Gothic buildings ever devoted in England to a scholastic purpose'. The foundation stone was blessed by Wilberforce on 7 June 1855. Hewett's plans were for a school for 100 commoners, 40 scholars and an unspecified number of choristers. In February 1855 a trust for the school was established, naming it All Saints' Grammar School, with the intent of providing for 'the liberal education of the sons of the clergy, gentry, Naval, Military and professional men and others'. Hewett contributed his own extensive library and the bulk of the funds for the ambitious building project. By mid-1856, Hewett was bankrupt and the school had failed to attract sufficient numbers of boys, who were expected to pay unusually high fees. Hewett's school, with several dozen pupils and incomplete buildings, was closed in April 1857. The school trust approached Nathaniel Woodard for help, but he was uninterested in buying or supporting the school.

Egerton's school

In 1859, Hewett's dilapidated school buildings were bought for £1,615 by Philip Reginald Egerton, a Church of England curate working in Deddington. Like Hewett, he was strongly influenced by the Oxford Movement and sought to establish a new school to teach its values. Egerton adopted the previous foundation's name of All Saints' School, and its motto, but based the school's ethos on that of his alma mater, Winchester College. He sought the backing of several notable academics and clergymen, including Wilberforce, Woodard and Henry Liddon. The project was initially funded by Egerton's wealthy wife, Harriet, and received its first pupil on 31 January 1860. Under the personal leadership of Egerton, Bloxham initially provided education for middle class boys in the public school tradition, although classics was originally not widely taught. In 1861 there were 29 pupils and by 1863 there were 60. Thanks to Wilberforce's continued support, Street drew up new plans for expanding the neo-Gothic school buildings, and additional money was provided by John Hubbard, 1st Baron Addington and John Spencer-Churchill, 7th Duke of Marlborough. The new buildings were unveiled in 1864 in the presence of Thomas Parker, 6th Earl of Macclesfield and Benjamin Disraeli. The Chapel Wing, the last of Street's buildings, was opened on 21 February 1873.

The school quickly grew, rising to two hundred pupils in twenty years. Despite Egerton's plans for the school to provide for local farmers and tradesmen, a report in 1870 found that most of the boys were from professional, ecclesiastical and military families. An 1879 plan by Egerton and Liddon to affiliate the school with Keble College, Oxford never came to fruition, and Egerton was forced to look elsewhere to ensure the school's long-term viability. The Bloxham School Trust was established in 1884, and in 1897 the school was admitted into the Woodard Corporation. Frederick Scobell Boissier, father of Harrow headmaster Arthur Boissier, taught at Bloxham from 1878 to 1898 and was headmaster from 1886. Education at the school focused on the notions of religious and civic duty, and the Anglo-Catholic nature of the foundation of the school remained a defining feature. Proposals to secularise the school by renaming it 'Bloxham College' were rejected in 1911 and 1951. Bloxham's first headmaster to not be a priest was only appointed in 1925.

During the 1890s, Bloxham shrank in size as the local provision of state education improved. The Education Act 1902 worsened the situation, as did a growing prejudice against high church practices in schools. The school's impressive academic record and high Oxbridge entrant rates in the 1900s helped it to survive. By the 1910s, a prefect system, house rivalries, corporal punishment and fagging confirmed Bloxham's identity as a conforming public school, although the latter two practices were abolished in the 1970s. Like many public schools, Bloxham suffered disproportionately high casualties during the First World War, in which over 400 current and former pupils served and 79 were killed. The school survived the subsequent economic depression, and embarked upon a series of ambitious educational and building reforms led by the school's first lay headmaster, Armitage. During the 1960s the school pioneered a tutoring system in which boys of multiple year groups shared a tutor. This system has since been imitated by many other boarding schools. Girls started to be admitted into the sixth form in small numbers in the early 1970s and the school became fully co-educational in 1998. The Lower School, for pupils aged 11–13, was opened in 1994.

Buildings and facilities

The Neo-Gothic complex of buildings designed by George Edmund Street, called Main School, dominates the school and the north end of the village. It contains two boarding houses, Crake and Wilson, the dining hall, the Masters' Dining Room, the Headmaster's office, the chapel, the 1894 Egerton Library and a number of classrooms. Palmer House, built in 1874 in the Neo-Gothic style, is the school hospital. Egerton House, on the edge of the school campus, was built in 1876 as the Headmaster's House, and was enlarged in 1886. The school's Great Hall was completed in 1937 and was built in the traditional Cotswold style. The Victorian-era Wesley Theatre, a former Methodist chapel, is the school theatre. The Science Block was built between 1959 and 1966. Wilberforce House was built in the late 1960s and Raymond House was opened in 1971 by Margaret Thatcher. Recent building developments include the Raymond Technology Centre, the expansion of the Lower School building and the Vallance Library which was opened by Colin Dexter in April 2006. New squash courts have also been built next to the Dewey Sports Centre, and the art school has been increased in size. The extension to the 1901 music school was completed in the summer of 2007, and officially opened by Aled Jones in November 2008. The Lower School is located in a modernised building called The White Lion, a former public house on the edge of the school campus.

Bloxham has a Church of England chapel which can accommodate approximately two hundred people. It was built at first-floor level with classrooms beneath, giving it an elevated position. At its west end is a balcony and organ loft, with an octagonal turret containing the bell tower rising above Main School. At the east end of the chapel is a large Te Deum window made by Clayton and Bell in memory of Wilberforce. The chapel also contains a rood screen, windows in memory of Egerton and the Boer Wars, and monuments to the school's war dead. The reredos was designed by Bucknall in 1912. The smaller Liddon Chapel, adjacent to the main chapel, is used as a classroom.

Bloxham School has four large playing fields, three of which are used for cricket in the summer term. It has two AstroTurf all-weather pitches, which are used for hockey and tennis, as well as additional hard tennis courts. The Dewey Sports Centre, opened by Anne, Princess Royal in 1986, has an indoor sports hall, a well-equipped gym and a climbing wall. Along with the swimming pool, which was extensively refurbished in 2014, it is available for public use. Bloxham also has Fives courts.

Deer Park is where the bursary is situated, as well as some of the buildings used by the CCF, including the armoury and shooting range. Woollen Hale, the house of Bloxham headmasters since 1986, is located on the top of Hobb Hill, overlooking playing fields and the Main School.

Houses

Like most traditional public schools, houses form the basis of school organisation and are incorporated into the boarding system. There are seven boarding houses within the senior school, as well as one day house (Merton). The boarding houses are Crake, Egerton, Raymond, Seymour, Stonehill, Wilberforce and Wilson, with Raymond, Stonehill and Wilberforce being the girls' houses. There is also a junior boarding house, Park Close, for the first form (Year 7) and second form (Year 8) weekly boarders, but all junior pupils are members of Exham House. The school operates a house based tutor system, in which pupils of several year groups share a tutor within one house. All houses are made up of both boarders and day pupils, who are called 'day boarders'. House captains are appointed each year and make up part of the school's prefect body. The two oldest houses are Crake and Wilson, previously called School House, with all the other houses constituted later. The newest boarding house to be built was Seymour, which was finished in 1982. Although Stonehill and Merton, in the current establishment were the last to be constituted but in older buildings than Seymour. Houses provide a focal point for social and sporting activity, with keen rivalries existing between different houses.

Religion

Chapel

The founder of Bloxham, P. R. Egerton, envisaged Bloxham as a school which would take in the sons of local families and turn out young men ‘well educated in the Christian faith.’ Religion still plays a major role in the life of the school and this is focussed on the Chapel of All Saints. Two Eucharistic services are held each week for the pupils in the chapel, and Morning Prayer is held every day. For larger school occasions such as Founderstide (the founder's day) and Christmas, the school uses St Mary's Church, Bloxham. The chaplain plays an important part in school life and is helped by a team of chapel prefects. Special arrangements are made for non-Anglicans to attend their own places of worship if required.

The school has hosted the Bloxham Festival of Faith and Literature since October 2011.

Bloxham Project
The Bloxham Project is an inter-school council started in the 1960s to address the role of religion in schools. It was started by the Chairman of Bloxham School Council and the school chaplain, Donald Dowie. The first Bloxham Conference on Public School Religion took place in 1967 at Bloxham School, and today approximately 120 independent schools take part in the project. It is a full-time organisation which continues to promote Christian educational values in the United Kingdom. The project is currently run from Ripon College Cuddesdon near Oxford, where several of Bloxham's headmasters have been educated.

Sport

Sport plays a significant role in Bloxham life, with afternoons on Tuesdays, Wednesdays and Saturdays being allocated to games' practices and matches for pupils in years 9–13. Every pupil in the school is involved in sport, with the aim being that each pupil will represent the school in at least one team during their time at Bloxham. The major sports are rugby, hockey and cricket for boys, and hockey, netball and tennis for girls. Other sports played at Bloxham include squash, athletics, swimming, golf, riding, polo, target shooting, clay pigeon shooting, fives, sailing, cross-country and badminton.

The school's main sporting rivals include Stowe School, St Edward's School, Oxford, Warwick School, Rugby School and Magdalen College School, Oxford. Bloxham participates annually in the NatWest Schools Cup for rugby union. Bloxham has recently won national titles in shooting, polo and riding, and regional titles in rugby, hockey and sailing.

Societies and pastimes

Bloxham has several societies, some of which are pupil-run. Notable school societies include the Scholars Society, the Debating Society and the Common Room Society. The Choral Society, or Chapel Choir, sing twice a week during the school's chapel services. Clubs include a Photography Club, a Wildlife Club and a Model Railway Club. Bloxham School was host of the British Youth Go Tournament in 2011. Pupils can take part in other activities, such as the Duke of Edinburgh Award, drama, community service, dance, adventure training, horse riding and management and horticulture.

Bloxham runs a Combined Cadet Force (CCF) for pupils in third form (Year 9) and above. This was founded in 1910 as the school's Officers' Training Corps. Bloxham is one of the few schools in the country to have been granted its own cap badge and many former members have served with distinction in the British armed forces. Most terms there is a CCF over-night expedition and a range day. The CCF was formerly affiliated with the Royal Green Jackets and is now affiliated with its successor regiment, The Rifles.

The school has a music department which offers professional tuition in brass, guitar, keyboard, organ, percussion, singing, strings and woodwind.

The school magazine is called The Bloxhamist and is published at the beginning of every Michaelmas term.

Prefects
The school’s prefect system was introduced in its current form by Armitage in the late 1920s. Prefects were solemnly initiated in chapel, and once in office they were responsible for much of the daily administration of the school. Prefects were in charge of most discipline and a prefectural code was introduced; school prefects could give up to six strokes with a cane, and house prefects three.

Today the school has various grades of prefect, all drawn from the Upper Sixth, each with different responsibilities and privileges:
School captains: One boy and, since coeducation, one girl. They lead the body of school prefects and meet daily with the headmaster. They are called the Head Boy and the Head Girl. 
School prefects: Their duties include keeping order, supervising the wellbeing of pupils and representing the school at events. They have numerous privileges. They wear gold trim on their jackets and a black tie with the school crest.
House captains: The senior pupil in each of the boarding houses. They lead the house prefects in their house and represent the house at events. They usually have a larger study in the boarding house, and are usually also school prefects. 
School Sacristan: Two prefects, who aid the school’s chaplain in day-to-day running of the chapel and promotion of the Christian ethos in the school. Leads the pastoral prefects and wears a blue tie with the school crest and cross, and a gold cross badge. Are also school prefects.
House prefects: A group of six to eight senior pupils in each of the boarding houses. Have duties within the house, including supervising prep, the dormitories and helping to keep order. They wear a black tie with multiple school crests on it, each in the house colour. 
Pastoral Prefects: A group of twelve prefects who help to keep order in chapel and promote the Christian ethos in the school. They wear a gold cross badge.

Motto and arms
The motto of Bloxham School is taken from Hewitt's 1853 school. A quotation from the Book of Proverbs, it is Justorum Semita Lux Splendens (Latin), which translates as "The path of the just is a shining light". Until 2009, the school arms was that of the Egerton family, although this usage was never registered with the College of Arms. It is now a stylised version of the original coat-of-arms.

Fees
The termly school fees as of June 2022 for a senior full boarding pupil are £12,295 per term (£36,885 per annum), £12,815 for overseas boarders (£38445 per annum), £9,430 per term (£28,290 per annum for day borders. This is a 20.6% increase from the 2014/15 academic year for full boarders. Bloxham was the third most expensive school in Oxfordshire in 2015.

Notable alumni

Current members of the school are known as 'Bloxhamists' with alumni referred to as 'Old Bloxhamists', or OBs for short. Notable OBs include:

Military
Colonel Sir Thomas Boswall Beach CMG CBE
Brigadier-General Sir William Henry Beach CB CMG DSO
Air Vice-Marshal Thomas Bowler CB CBE
General Sir Adrian Bradshaw KCB OBE, Deputy Supreme Allied Commander Europe
General Sir Edward Burgess, NATO Deputy Supreme Allied Commander
Garrison Sergeant Major Vivian Davenport MBE MC DCM & Bar
Major General Richard Roderick Davis CB CBE 
Lieutenant David Eastwood CBE MC
Brigadier-General Wilfred Ellershaw, Aide-de-Camp to Lord Kitchener
Squadron Leader Dave Glaser DFC AE
Colonel L. A. Grimston CIE OBE VD
Major-General Reginald Hewer CB CBE MC
Air Marshal Sir Francis John Linnell KBE CB
Captain Harry Godfrey Massy-Miles MC
Colonel Sir Henry Allan Roughton May CB
Air Commodore Sir Dennis Mitchell KBE CVO DFC AFC
Squadron Leader C. T. N. Moore MBE 
Admiral of the Fleet Sir Gerard Noel GCB KCMG, Commander-in-Chief, Home Fleet
Lieutenant-General Dudley Sheridan Skelton CB DSO MC, Honorary Surgeon to HM King George V
Major-General Bruce M. Skinner CMG CBE MVO, Surgeon-General to the British Armed Forces
Major Derrick le Poer Trench DSO MC
Lieutenant St John Graham Young GC
Brigadier Dimitry Dimitrievitch Zvegintzov CBE OStJ

Government and politics
Peter J P Barwell MBE, Lord Mayor of Birmingham 1992-3
Sir Peter H. Clutterbuck CIE CBE VD, colonial civil servant in British India
Alexander Granville CMG CBE, colonial administrator in Egypt
Sir Gerald Howarth, Conservative politician and Member of Parliament
Eustace Maude, 7th Viscount Hawarden, peer and colonial provincial governor in Sudan
E. H. D. Nicolls CMG OBE, British colonial official
Denis Norman, former Government Minister in Zimbabwe
Frederic Urquhart, colonial administrator in Australia

Religion
Fr Sergei Hackel, senior priest in Britain of the Russian Orthodox Diocese of Sourozh.
George Hand, Anglican bishop
Victor White, theologian and psychotherapist

The arts
George S Elgood, painter
Ross Nichols, academic, poet, artist and historian  
Stephen Reynolds, writer
Tom Sharpe, novelist
Peter Snow, painter, theatre designer and teacher.
Albert Chevallier Tayler, painter
Leonard Shuffrey, the notable architect and architectural designer attended Bloxham between 1856 and 1867.
Henry Tonks FRCS, artist
Pip Torrens, actor
Joseph Vernon Whitaker, Editor, The Bookseller

Other
Will Bratt, Formula Three racing driver
Sheraz Daya, British Ophthalmologist
Saskia Jones, victim of the November 2019 London Bridge terrorist attack
G. Kenneth Jenkins, Keeper of the Coins at the British Museum
Thomas Sanderson-Wells MBE
John Sergeant, journalist
Ward Thomas CBE DFC CdeG, Television Executive
Alfie Barbeary, Rugby Union Player

Bloxham School war dead
The stone arch at the main entrance to the school was built to the memory of Bloxham pupils who have died in conflict, and the school chapel contains memorials to the school's war dead from multiple conflicts. Bloxham suffered a high casualty rate during World War I, in which 79 current and former pupils were killed. The portraits of the school's dead of the First World War are hung near the chapel.

Headmasters

The first five headmasters at Bloxham were ordained Anglican priests, with the first lay headmaster being appointed in 1925. The portraits of former headmasters hang in the school dining hall.
Philip Egerton (1860–1886)
 F. S. Boissier (1886–1898)
 G. H. Ward (1899–1914)
Alexander Grier (1914–1919)
 F. H. George (1919–1925)
Valentine Armitage (1925–1940)
K. T. Dewey (1940–1952)
R. S. Thompson (1952–1965)
D. R. G. Seymour (1965–1982)
M. W. Vallance (1982–1991)
D. K. Exham (1991–2002)
Mark Allbrook (2002–2013)
 P. Sanderson (2013–present)

Notable masters
Mark Allbrook, former Headmaster
 Frederick Scobell Boissier, former Headmaster, father of Arthur Boissier
Cedric Boyns, Housemaster
 Philip Reginald Egerton, founder
Felix Francis, crime writer, Bloxham Head of Science 1984-1991
 Cyril Frost, artist and silversmith
David Hatch, student teacher
Kenneth Spring OBE, former Commander of the CCF, housemaster and art master

References

External links

Profile at the Independent Schools Council website

Anglo-Catholic educational establishments
Private schools in Oxfordshire
Woodard Schools
Educational institutions established in 1860
Member schools of the Headmasters' and Headmistresses' Conference
People educated at Bloxham School
G. E. Street buildings
Gothic Revival architecture in Oxfordshire
Church of England private schools in the Diocese of Oxford
Boarding schools in Oxfordshire
1860 establishments in England